Screen on the Green was an annual summertime outdoor film festival in Washington, D.C. hosted by HBO and Comcast. The free outdoor screenings were usually held on Monday nights in July and August and started at sunset (approximately 8:30 p.m.)

The movies were usually projected onto a theater-size portable screen on the National Mall between 7th and 12th Streets, Northwest.  Organizers cancelled Screen on the Green in 2016 when HBO and Comcast ended their sponsorship of the event, stating that they needed their resources for other projects.

2015 films 
Screen on the Green showed the following films in 2015:

 July 20 (Monday) – North by Northwest (1959)
 July 27 (Monday) – The Poseidon Adventure (1972)
 August 3 (Monday) – Desk Set (1957)
 August 10 (Monday) – Back to the Future (1985)

2014 films 
Screen on the Green showed the following films in 2014:

 July 21 (Monday) – The Karate Kid (1984)
 July 28 (Monday) – Lover Come Back (1961)
 August 4 (Monday) – Key Largo (1948)
 August 11 (Monday) – A Soldier's Story (1984)

2013 films 
Screen on the Green showed the following films in 2013:

 July 22 (Monday) – E.T. the Extra-Terrestrial (1982)
 July 29 (Monday) – Norma Rae (1979)
 August 5 (Monday) – Willy Wonka & the Chocolate Factory (1971)
 August 12 (Monday) – Tootsie (1982)

2012 films 
Screen on the Green showed the following films in 2012:

 July 16 (Monday) – Butch Cassidy and the Sundance Kid
 July 25 (Wednesday) – It Happened One Night
 July 30 (Monday) – From Here to Eternity
 August 6 (Monday) – Psycho

2011 films 
Screen on the Green showed the following films in 2011:

 July 25 – In the Heat of the Night
 August 1 – One Flew Over the Cuckoo’s Nest
 August 8 – Gentlemen Prefer Blondes
 August 15 – Cool Hand Luke

2010 films 
Screen on the Green showed the following films in 2010:

 July 12 – Goldfinger
 July 19 – The Goodbye Girl
 July 26 – 12 Angry Men
 August 2 – Bonnie and Clyde

2009 films 
On May 12, 2009, HBO announced that it was cancelling its sponsorship of Screen on the Green, and the future of the popular outdoor movie series was in doubt while another sponsor was sought.

Almost immediately, a Facebook fan group appeared, rallying a grassroots effort to save "Screen on the Green". Led by Jesse B Rauch, President and Founder of "Friends of Screen on the Green," over 2,500 Facebook users subscribed to the group. A massive e-mail campaign was launched to find new sponsors, and on June 10, 2009, Comcast and the Trust for the National Mall announced they would join forces with Time Warner's HBO to bring back Screen on the Green to the National Mall in the summer of 2009.

Screen on the Green showed the following films in 2009:

 July 20 – Close Encounters of the Third Kind
 July 27 – Dog Day Afternoon
 August 3 – On the Waterfront
 August 10 – Rebel Without a Cause

2008 films 
Screen on the Green showed the following films in 2008:

 July 14 – Dr. No
 July 21 – The Candidate
 July 28 – Arsenic and Old Lace
 August 4 – The Apartment
 August 11 – Superman

2007 films 
Screen on the Green showed the following films in 2007:

 July 16 – Annie Hall
 July 23 – The Thing from Another World
 July 30 – Wait Until Dark
 August 6 – All the King's Men
 August 13 – Casablanca

2006 films 
Screen on the Green showed the following films in 2006:

 July 17 – The Day the Earth Stood Still
 July 24 – The Band Wagon
 July 31 – Bullitt
 August 7 – To Have and Have Not
 August 14 – Rocky

2005 films 
Screen on the Green showed the following films in 2005:

 July 18 – The Way We Were
 July 25 – The Treasure of Sierra Madre
 August 1 – Suspicion
 August 8 – Who's Afraid of Virginia Woolf
 August 15 – The Big Sleep

External links
Official website for Screen on the Green Film Festival in DC - Archived from the original.
Official Facebook Group

References

Film festivals in Washington, D.C.
Environmental film festivals in the United States